Markus Puusepp (born March 6, 1986 in Võru) is a former Estonian orienteering competitor and junior world champion.

He became Junior World Champion in the relay in Druskininkai in 2006, together with Mihkel Järveoja and Timo Sild. He received a bronze medal in the long course at the same championship.

He competed at the 2009 World Orienteering Championships in Miskolc, Hungary.

He was the event director for 2017 World Orienteering Championships in Tartu, Estonia.

See also
 Estonian orienteers
 List of orienteers
 List of orienteering events

References

External links
 
 Markus Puusepp at World of O Runners

1986 births
Living people
Estonian orienteers
Male orienteers
Foot orienteers
Sportspeople from Võru
Junior World Orienteering Championships medalists